The Boone–Murphy House (formerly known as the Union Army Headquarters House) is a historic house located in Pine Bluff, Arkansas.

Description
It is a single-story, single-pile, wood-framed structure, with a front gable roof and weatherboard siding. Shed-roof additions extend to either side, and there is bargeboard trim on the gables.

History
The house was built in 1860 by Thomas A. Boone and was originally located at 702 W. Second Avenue.

During the U.S. Civil War, following the Union Army capture of Little Rock, Arkansas, the citizens of Pine Bluff asked that a Union garrison be stationed there for their protection.  General Frederick Steele sent the 5th Kansas Cavalry and 1st Indiana Cavalry to Pine Bluff to establish a post.  Union Army Colonel Powell Clayton established his headquarters and home in the Boone-Murphy house. in 1863.

In October 1863 a band of Confederate spies raided Clayton's headquarters.  They were able to secure intelligence on Union army activities but failed to capture Clayton.

Following the Civil War, Clayton mortgaged the house to Robert S. Thompson and William H. Dupuy, and when the loan was not paid the house was sold to John P. Murphy.  The Murphy's lived in the house until 1892.  Following John Murphy's death, his widow remarried Charles F. Moore.

The Boone–Murphy House has been restored to a 1920s appearance and is owned and operated by the Heckatoo Heritage Foundation.  In 2014, the house was used by a Pine Bluff Community Watch program.

In 1977, the home was relocated to West 4th Avenue to ensure that it would be located in a historic district.

The house was listed on the National Register of Historic Places on February 18, 1979.

See also
National Register of Historic Places listings in Jefferson County, Arkansas

References

Houses completed in 1860
Houses in Pine Bluff, Arkansas
Houses on the National Register of Historic Places in Arkansas
National Register of Historic Places in Pine Bluff, Arkansas
Central-passage houses